The 1999 Philadelphia Phillies season was the 117th season in the history of the franchise.

Offseason
November 5, 1998: Torey Lovullo was signed as a free agent with the Philadelphia Phillies.
November 9, 1998: Paul Spoljaric was traded by the Seattle Mariners to the Philadelphia Phillies for Mark Leiter.
November 19, 1998: Ricky Bottalico was traded by the Philadelphia Phillies with Garrett Stephenson to the St. Louis Cardinals for Jeff Brantley, Ron Gant, and Cliff Politte.
December 22, 1998: Rob Ducey was signed as a free agent with the Philadelphia Phillies.

Regular season

The Phillies were early contenders for the wild card, going a season-high 13 games over .500 on August 6 (61–48), but injuries to pitching staff ace Curt Schilling and third baseman Scott Rolen, as well as a struggling bullpen, proved too tough to overcome. In one particularly bad stretch from August 28 to September 14, the Phillies went 1–18.

Season standings

Record vs. opponents

Transactions
May 5, 1999: Paul Spoljaric was traded by the Philadelphia Phillies to the Toronto Blue Jays for Robert Person.
June 2, 1999: Brett Myers was drafted by the Philadelphia Phillies in the 1st round (12th pick) of the 1999 amateur draft. Player signed July 9, 1999.
June 2, 1999: Marlon Byrd was drafted by the Philadelphia Phillies in the 10th round of the 1999 amateur draft. Player signed June 4, 1999.

1999 Game Log

|- style="background:#bfb"
| 1 || April 5 || @ Braves || 7–4 || Curt Schilling (1–0) || Tom Glavine (0–1) || Jeff Brantley (1) || 47,522 || 1–0
|- style="background:#fbb"
| 2 || April 6 || @ Braves || 3–11 || Greg Maddux (1–0) || Chad Ogea (0–1) || Derrin Ebert (1) || 29,183 || 1–1
|- style="background:#fbb"
| 3 || April 7 || @ Braves || 0–4 || John Smoltz (1–0) || Carlton Loewer (0–1) || None || 32,164 || 1–2
|- style="background:#bfb"
| 4 || April 8 || @ Braves || 6–3 || Paul Byrd (1–0) || Kevin Millwood (0–1) || Jeff Brantley (2) || 47,225 || 2–2
|- style="background:#fbb"
| 5 || April 9 || @ Marlins || 4–7 || Brian Meadows (1–0) || Paul Spoljaric (0–1) || None || 13,229 || 2–3
|- style="background:#bfb"
| 6 || April 10 || @ Marlins || 5–2 || Curt Schilling (2–0) || Dennis Springer (0–1) || Jeff Brantley (3) || 22,776 || 3–3
|- style="background:#bfb"
| 7 || April 11 || @ Marlins || 2–1 || Chad Ogea (1–1) || Alex Fernandez (1–1) || Jeff Brantley (4) || 14,954 || 4–3
|- style="background:#fbb"
| 8 || April 12 || Braves || 6–8 || Mike Cather (1–0) || Ken Ryan (0–1) || Rudy Seánez (1) || 37,582 || 4–4
|- style="background:#fbb"
| 9 || April 14 || Braves || 4–10 || Kevin Millwood (1–1) || Paul Byrd (1–1) || None || 16,287 || 4–5
|- style="background:#bbb"
| – || April 15 || Braves || colspan=6 | Postponed (rain); Makeup: July 23 as a traditional double-header
|- style="background:#bfb"
| 10 || April 16 || Marlins || 17–3 || Curt Schilling (3–0) || Dennis Springer (0–2) || None || 12,079 || 5–5
|- style="background:#bfb"
| 11 || April 17 || Marlins || 2–1 || Wayne Gomes (1–0) || Antonio Alfonseca (0–1) || None || 14,817 || 6–5
|- style="background:#bfb"
| 12 || April 18 || Marlins || 7–5 || Carlton Loewer (1–1) || Kirt Ojala (0–1) || None || 17,176 || 7–5
|- style="background:#fbb"
| 13 || April 19 || @ Diamondbacks || 2–3 || Omar Daal (2–0) || Yorkis Pérez (0–1) || Greg Swindell (1) || 29,704 || 7–6
|- style="background:#fbb"
| 14 || April 20 || @ Diamondbacks || 1–8 || Randy Johnson (2–1) || Paul Spoljaric (0–2) || None || 30,546 || 7–7
|- style="background:#fbb"
| 15 || April 21 || @ Diamondbacks || 2–4 || Todd Stottlemyre (2–0) || Curt Schilling (3–1) || Gregg Olson (1) || 31,421 || 7–8
|- style="background:#bfb"
| 16 || April 23 || @ Expos || 6–2 || Chad Ogea (2–1) || Dustin Hermanson (2–1) || None || 8,818 || 8–8
|- style="background:#bfb"
| 17 || April 24 || @ Expos || 6–5 || Mike Grace (1–0) || Bobby Ayala (0–2) || Wayne Gomes (1) || 8,212 || 9–8
|- style="background:#bfb"
| 18 || April 25 || @ Expos || 8–6 || Paul Byrd (2–1) || Ugueth Urbina (1–2) || None || 9,280 || 10–8
|- style="background:#bfb"
| 19 || April 27 || Reds || 1–0 (10) || Jeff Brantley (1–0) || Gabe White (0–2) || None || 14,114 || 11–8
|- style="background:#fbb"
| 20 || April 28 || Reds || 8–12 || Scott Williamson (1–1) || Jeff Brantley (1–1) || None || 12,354 || 11–9
|- style="background:#fbb"
| 21 || April 29 || Reds || 3–7 || Jason Bere (2–0) || Carlton Loewer (1–2) || None || 12,248 || 11–10
|- style="background:#fbb"
| 22 || April 30 || Dodgers || 3–4 || Carlos Pérez (1–3) || Paul Byrd (2–2) || Jeff Shaw (7) || 20,024 || 11–11
|-

|- style="background:#fbb"
| 23 || May 1 || Dodgers || 6–12 || Darren Dreifort (4–1) || Paul Spoljaric (0–3) || None || 22,053 || 11–12
|- style="background:#bfb"
| 24 || May 2 || Dodgers || 12–3 || Curt Schilling (4–1) || Kevin Brown (2–2) || None || 34,608 || 12–12
|- style="background:#fbb"
| 25 || May 3 || Padres || 3–9 || Sterling Hitchcock (2–1) || Chad Ogea (2–2) || None || 11,032 || 12–13
|- style="background:#bfb"
| 26 || May 4 || Padres || 3–0 || Carlton Loewer (2–2) || Woody Williams (1–1) || None || 15,183 || 13–13
|- style="background:#bfb"
| 27 || May 5 || Padres || 11–1 || Paul Byrd (3–2) || Stan Spencer (0–4) || None || 18,229 || 14–13
|- style="background:#bfb"
| 28 || May 7 || @ Rockies || 8–1 || Curt Schilling (5–1) || John Thomson (0–4) || None || 41,465 || 15–13
|- style="background:#bfb"
| 29 || May 8 || @ Rockies || 7–2 || Joel Bennett (1–0) || Brian Bohanon (5–1) || None || 43,340 || 16–13
|- style="background:#bfb"
| 30 || May 9 || @ Rockies || 10–8 || Ken Ryan (1–1) || Dave Veres (1–2) || Wayne Gomes (2) || 40,251 || 17–13
|- style="background:#fbb"
| 31 || May 10 || @ Cardinals || 2–5 || Kent Bottenfield (5–1) || Carlton Loewer (2–3) || Scott Radinsky (3) || 34,789 || 17–14
|- style="background:#bfb"
| 32 || May 11 || @ Cardinals || 9–4 || Paul Byrd (4–2) || Kent Mercker (2–2) || None || 32,307 || 18–14
|- style="background:#bfb"
| 33 || May 12 || @ Cardinals || 8–4 || Curt Schilling (6–1) || Darren Oliver (2–2) || None || 45,540 || 19–14
|- style="background:#fbb"
| 34 || May 14 || Mets || 3–7 || Masato Yoshii (3–3) || Chad Ogea (2–3) || None || 21,074 || 19–15
|- style="background:#fbb"
| 35 || May 15 || Mets || 7–9 || Pat Mahomes (1–0) || Ken Ryan (1–2) || John Franco (11) || 27,039 || 19–16
|- style="background:#bfb"
| 36 || May 15 || Mets || 5–2 || Paul Byrd (5–2) || Orel Hershiser (2–4) || Jeff Brantley (5) || 28,422 || 20–16
|- style="background:#bfb"
| 37 || May 17 || @ Expos || 4–3 || Curt Schilling (7–1) || Mike Thurman (0–3) || None || 5,104 || 21–16
|- style="background:#fbb"
| 38 || May 18 || @ Expos || 4–7 || Miguel Batista (3–1) || Joel Bennett (1–1) || Ugueth Urbina (7) || 4,660 || 21–17
|- style="background:#fbb"
| 39 || May 19 || @ Expos || 9–10 || Steve Kline (1–1) || Jeff Brantley (1–2) || None || 5,182 || 21–18
|- style="background:#fbb"
| 40 || May 21 || @ Mets || 5–7 || Orel Hershiser (3–4) || Carlton Loewer (2–4) || John Franco (13) || 24,554 || 21–19
|- style="background:#bfb"
| 41 || May 22 || @ Mets || 9–3 || Paul Byrd (6–2) || Bobby J. Jones (3–3) || None || 34,575 || 22–19
|- style="background:#fbb"
| 42 || May 23 || @ Mets || 4–5 || Rigo Beltrán (1–0) || Curt Schilling (7–2) || None || 34,950 || 22–20
|- style="background:#bfb"
| 43 || May 24 || Expos || 5–4 || Yorkis Pérez (1–1) || Miguel Batista (3–2) || Wayne Gomes (3) || 13,953 || 23–20
|- style="background:#fbb"
| 44 || May 25 || Expos || 2–4 (11) || Ugueth Urbina (3–4) || Steve Montgomery (0–1) || None || 15,876 || 23–21
|- style="background:#fbb"
| 45 || May 26 || Expos || 2–5 || Carl Pavano (3–5) || Carlton Loewer (2–5) || Ugueth Urbina (8) || 13,168 || 23–22
|- style="background:#fbb"
| 46 || May 28 || Rockies || 3–5 || Curtis Leskanic (2–1) || Paul Byrd (6–3) || Dave Veres (6) || 16,365 || 23–23
|- style="background:#bfb"
| 47 || May 29 || Rockies || 2–0 || Curt Schilling (8–2) || Brian Bohanon (6–3) || None || 22,204 || 24–23
|- style="background:#fbb"
| 48 || May 30 || Rockies || 0–1 || Darryl Kile (4–3) || Jim Poole (0–1) || Dave Veres (7) || 30,358 || 24–24
|- style="background:#bfb"
| 49 || May 31 || Giants || 4–3 || Yorkis Pérez (2–1) || John Johnstone (4–2) || Wayne Gomes (4) || 16,323 || 25–24
|-

|- style="background:#fbb"
| 50 || June 1 || Giants || 5–6 (12) || Robb Nen (2–1) || Wayne Gomes (1–1) || None || 13,050 || 25–25
|- style="background:#bfb"
| 51 || June 2 || Giants || 7–6 || Paul Byrd (7–3) || Russ Ortiz (6–4) || Wayne Gomes (5) || 13,616 || 26–25
|- style="background:#fbb"
| 52 || June 3 || Giants || 4–7 || Jerry Spradlin (1–1) || Curt Schilling (8–3) || Robb Nen (16) || 20,560 || 26–26
|- style="background:#bfb"
| 53 || June 4 || @ Orioles || 9–5 || Chad Ogea (3–3) || Scott Erickson (1–8) || None || 47,542 || 27–26
|- style="background:#fbb"
| 54 || June 5 || @ Orioles || 6–7 (10) || Mike Timlin (2–4) || Steve Montgomery (0–2) || None || 48,531 || 27–27
|- style="background:#bfb"
| 55 || June 6 || @ Orioles || 11–7 || Joel Bennett (2–1) || Ricky Bones (0–2) || None || 47,833 || 28–27
|- style="background:#bfb"
| 56 || June 7 || Yankees || 6–5 || Paul Byrd (8–3) || Andy Pettitte (3–4) || None || 37,180 || 29–27
|- style="background:#bfb"
| 57 || June 8 || Yankees || 11–5 || Yorkis Pérez (3–1) || Jason Grimsley (5–1) || None || 44,444 || 30–27
|- style="background:#fbb"
| 58 || June 9 || Yankees || 5–11 || David Cone (6–2) || Chad Ogea (3–4) || None || 42,047 || 30–28
|- style="background:#bfb"
| 59 || June 11 || Blue Jays || 8–4 || Randy Wolf (1–0) || Joey Hamilton (0–4) || None || 26,541 || 31–28
|- style="background:#bfb"
| 60 || June 12 || Blue Jays || 7–2 || Paul Byrd (9–3) || Kelvim Escobar (5–4) || None || 20,449 || 32–28
|- style="background:#fbb"
| 61 || June 13 || Blue Jays || 2–7 || Pat Hentgen (5–5) || Curt Schilling (8–4) || None || 28,459 || 32–29
|- style="background:#fbb"
| 62 || June 15 || @ Padres || 1–6 || Matt Clement (2–7) || Chad Ogea (3–5) || None || 16,134 || 32–30
|- style="background:#bfb"
| 63 || June 16 || @ Padres || 4–2 || Randy Wolf (2–0) || Sterling Hitchcock (4–6) || Wayne Gomes (6) || 15,136 || 33–30
|- style="background:#bfb"
| 64 || June 17 || @ Padres || 7–5 || Paul Byrd (10–3) || Woody Williams (2–5) || Wayne Gomes (7) || 16,671 || 34–30
|- style="background:#bfb"
| 65 || June 18 || @ Dodgers || 2–1 || Curt Schilling (9–4) || Ismael Valdez (5–6) || Wayne Gomes (8) || 41,590 || 35–30
|- style="background:#fbb"
| 66 || June 19 || @ Dodgers || 1–8 || Darren Dreifort (6–5) || Robert Person (0–3) || None || 32,315 || 35–31
|- style="background:#fbb"
| 67 || June 20 || @ Dodgers || 2–3 || Kevin Brown (8–4) || Chad Ogea (3–6) || Jeff Shaw (16) || 46,347 || 35–32
|- style="background:#bfb"
| 68 || June 22 || Pirates || 3–2 || Randy Wolf (3–0) || Francisco Córdova (2–3) || Wayne Gomes (9) || 18,835 || 36–32
|- style="background:#fbb"
| 69 || June 23 || Pirates || 6–8 || Kris Benson (6–5) || Paul Byrd (10–4) || Mike Williams (13) || 20,256 || 36–33
|- style="background:#bfb"
| 70 || June 24 || Pirates || 7–5 || Curt Schilling (10–4) || José Silva (2–5) || Wayne Gomes (10) || 25,848 || 37–33
|- style="background:#bfb"
| 71 || June 25 || @ Cubs || 3–2 || Chad Ogea (4–6) || Jon Lieber (6–3) || Wayne Gomes (11) || 40,553 || 38–33
|- style="background:#bfb"
| 72 || June 26 || @ Cubs || 6–2 || Robert Person (1–3) || Steve Trachsel (2–10) || None || 40,466 || 39–33
|- style="background:#fbb"
| 73 || June 27 || @ Cubs || 7–13 || Terry Mulholland (4–3) || Mike Grace (1–1) || None || 38,455 || 39–34
|- style="background:#fbb"
| 74 || June 28 || @ Pirates || 2–3 (10) || Greg Hansell (1–0) || Steve Montgomery (0–3) || None || 14,144 || 39–35
|- style="background:#bfb"
| 75 || June 29 || @ Pirates || 7–4 || Curt Schilling (11–4) || José Silva (2–6) || None || 16,343 || 40–35
|- style="background:#fbb"
| 76 || June 30 || @ Pirates || 1–9 || Jason Schmidt (8–5) || Chad Ogea (4–7) || None || 14,526 || 40–36
|-

|- style="background:#fbb"
| 77 || July 1 || @ Pirates || 7–12 || Todd Ritchie (7–6) || Robert Person (1–4) || None || 11,174 || 40–37
|- style="background:#bfb"
| 78 || July 2 || Cubs || 14–1 || Randy Wolf (4–0) || Terry Mulholland (4–4) || None || 50,498 || 41–37
|- style="background:#bfb"
| 79 || July 3 || Cubs || 21–8 || Paul Byrd (11–4) || Kyle Farnsworth (2–3) || None || 58,086 || 42–37
|- style="background:#bfb"
| 80 || July 4 || Cubs || 6–2 || Curt Schilling (12–4) || Kevin Tapani (6–5) || None || 20,097 || 43–37
|- style="background:#fbb"
| 81 || July 5 || Brewers || 0–5 || Jim Abbott (2–7) || Chad Ogea (4–8) || Rafael Roque (1) || 13,248 || 43–38
|- style="background:#bfb"
| 82 || July 6 || Brewers || 1–0 || Robert Person (2–4) || Hideo Nomo (6–2) || Wayne Gomes (12) || 13,006 || 44–38
|- style="background:#bfb"
| 83 || July 7 || Brewers || 5–4 || Wayne Gomes (2–1) || Bob Wickman (2–4) || None || 16,593 || 45–38
|- style="background:#bfb"
| 84 || July 9 || Orioles || 4–2 || Curt Schilling (13–4) || Juan Guzmán (4–7) || None || 28,182 || 46–38
|- style="background:#fbb"
| 85 || July 10 || Orioles || 4–8 || Mike Mussina (11–4) || Paul Byrd (11–5) || None || 32,300 || 46–39
|- style="background:#fbb"
| 86 || July 11 || Orioles || 2–6 || Scott Erickson (4–8) || Chad Ogea (4–9) || None || 33,399 || 46–40
|- style="background:#bbcaff;"
| – || July 13 ||colspan="7" |1999 Major League Baseball All-Star Game at Fenway Park in Boston
|- style="background:#fbb"
| 87 || July 15 || @ Red Sox || 4–6 || Brian Rose (5–2) || Paul Byrd (11–6) || Tim Wakefield (11) || 32,397 || 46–41
|- style="background:#bfb"
| 88 || July 16 || @ Red Sox || 5–4 || Robert Person (3–4) || Bret Saberhagen (6–3) || Wayne Gomes (13) || 32,899 || 47–41
|- style="background:#bfb"
| 89 || July 17 || @ Red Sox || 11–3 || Randy Wolf (5–0) || Mark Portugal (5–7) || None || 32,228 || 48–41
|- style="background:#bfb"
| 90 || July 18 || @ Devil Rays || 3–2 || Curt Schilling (14–4) || Albie Lopez (1–2) || None || 20,075 || 49–41
|- style="background:#bfb"
| 91 || July 19 || @ Devil Rays || 16–3 || Chad Ogea (5–9) || Bryan Rekar (6–5) || None || 17,600 || 50–41
|- style="background:#fbb"
| 92 || July 20 || @ Devil Rays || 4–5 (13) || Norm Charlton (1–2) || Steve Schrenk (0–1) || None || 30,868 || 50–42
|- style="background:#bfb"
| 93 || July 21 || @ Brewers || 7–0 || Robert Person (4–4) || Scott Karl (7–8) || Jim Poole (1) || 21,933 || 51–42
|- style="background:#fbb"
| 94 || July 22 || @ Brewers || 0–5 || Hideo Nomo (9–2) || Randy Wolf (5–1) || None || 29,777 || 51–43
|- style="background:#bfb"
| 95 || July 23 (1) || Braves || 6–5 || Amaury Telemaco (2–0) || Rudy Seánez (5–1) || Wayne Gomes (14) || see 2nd game || 52–43
|- style="background:#fbb"
| 96 || July 23 (2) || Braves || 1–3 || Bruce Chen (1–1) || Anthony Shumaker (0–1) || John Rocker (20) || 32,673 || 52–44
|- style="background:#bfb"
| 97 || July 24 || Braves || 4–3 || Steve Montgomery (1–3) || Micah Bowie (0–1) || Wayne Gomes (15) || 30,167 || 53–44
|- style="background:#fbb"
| 98 || July 25 || Braves || 4–5 (10) || John Rocker (3–3) || Steve Montgomery (1–4) || None || 25,659 || 53–45
|- style="background:#bfb"
| 99 || July 26 || Marlins || 9–1 || Robert Person (5–4) || Vladimir Núñez (4–4) || None || 16,047 || 54–45
|- style="background:#fbb"
| 100 || July 27 || Marlins || 2–6 || Alex Fernandez (5–6) || Randy Wolf (5–2) || Antonio Alfonseca (7) || 18,282 || 54–46
|- style="background:#bfb"
| 101 || July 28 || Marlins || 9–4 || Steve Schrenk (1–1) || Ryan Dempster (4–6) || None || 17,497 || 55–46
|- style="background:#bfb"
| 102 || July 29 || Marlins || 12–1 || Chad Ogea (6–9) || Brian Meadows (8–11) || None || 26,834 || 56–46
|- style="background:#bfb"
| 103 || July 30 || @ Braves || 9–2 || Paul Byrd (12–6) || John Smoltz (8–4) || None || 48,605 || 57–46
|- style="background:#fbb"
| 104 || July 31 || @ Braves || 6–8 || Tom Glavine (9–9) || Robert Person (5–5) || John Rocker (21) || 50,203 || 57–47
|-

|- style="background:#fbb"
| 105 || August 1 || @ Braves || 4–12 || Greg Maddux (12–6) || Randy Wolf (5–3) || None || 37,521 || 57–48
|- style="background:#bfb"
| 106 || August 3 || @ Marlins || 6–5 || Amaury Telemaco (3–0) || Brian Edmondson (4–6) || Wayne Gomes (16) || 10,223 || 58–48
|- style="background:#bfb"
| 107 || August 4 || @ Marlins || 4–1 || Paul Byrd (13–6) || Dennis Springer (5–11) || Steve Schrenk (1) || 10,445 || 59–48
|- style="background:#bfb"
| 108 || August 5 || @ Marlins || 9–3 || Robert Person (6–5) || Vladimir Núñez (4–5) || None || 9,610 || 60–48
|- style="background:#bfb"
| 109 || August 6 || Diamondbacks || 4–2 (11) || Wayne Gomes (3–1) || Bobby Chouinard (4–2) || None || 27,742 || 61–48
|- style="background:#fbb"
| 110 || August 7 || Diamondbacks || 2–8 || Andy Benes (7–10) || Curt Schilling (14–5) || None || 18,766 || 61–49
|- style="background:#fbb"
| 111 || August 8 || Diamondbacks || 4–7 || Armando Reynoso (8–1) || Chad Ogea (6–10) || Matt Mantei (19) || 32,047 || 61–50
|- style="background:#fbb"
| 112 || August 9 || Cardinals || 6–12 || Kent Mercker (5–4) || Steve Schrenk (1–2) || None || 46,102 || 61–51
|- style="background:#bfb"
| 113 || August 10 || Cardinals || 7–5 || Jim Poole (1–1) || Ricky Bottalico (1–6) || Wayne Gomes (17) || 48,514 || 62–51
|- style="background:#fbb"
| 114 || August 11 || Cardinals || 1–5 || Garrett Stephenson (3–0) || Randy Wolf (5–4) || Heathcliff Slocumb (2) || 45,830 || 62–52
|- style="background:#fbb"
| 115 || August 13 || @ Reds || 4–5 || Scott Williamson (11–5) || Steve Schrenk (1–3) || None || 26,353 || 62–53
|- style="background:#fbb"
| 116 || August 14 || @ Reds || 1–4 || Pete Harnisch (12–6) || Chad Ogea (6–11) || Danny Graves (17) || 25,214 || 62–54
|- style="background:#bfb"
| 117 || August 15 || @ Reds || 9–3 || Robert Person (7–5) || Denny Neagle (3–4) || None || 27,059 || 63–54
|- style="background:#fbb"
| 118 || August 16 || @ Cardinals || 3–4 || Kent Mercker (6–4) || Randy Wolf (5–5) || Ricky Bottalico (18) || 36,741 || 63–55
|- style="background:#fbb"
| 119 || August 17 || @ Cardinals || 5–6 || Juan Acevedo (5–4) || Wayne Gomes (3–2) || None || 38,557 || 63–56
|- style="background:#bfb"
| 120 || August 18 || @ Cardinals || 6–5 || Scott Aldred (4–2) || Rich Croushore (3–3) || Wayne Gomes (18) || 38,047 || 64–56
|- style="background:#fbb"
| 121 || August 20 || Dodgers || 5–8 (10) || Alan Mills (3–4) || Wayne Gomes (3–3) || None || 17,444 || 64–57
|- style="background:#bfb"
| 122 || August 21 || Dodgers || 6–5 (11) || Wayne Gomes (4–3) || Onan Masaoka (2–3) || None || 22,078 || 65–57
|- style="background:#fbb"
| 123 || August 22 || Dodgers || 7–9 || Chan Ho Park (7–10) || Anthony Shumaker (0–2) || Jeff Shaw (25) || 22,510 || 65–58
|- style="background:#fbb"
| 124 || August 23 || Padres || 6–7 || Woody Williams (7–11) || Chad Ogea (6–12) || Trevor Hoffman (32) || 18,759 || 65–59
|- style="background:#bfb"
| 125 || August 24 || Padres || 18–2 || Paul Byrd (14–6) || Stan Spencer (0–7) || None || 18,126 || 66–59
|- style="background:#bfb"
| 126 || August 25 || Padres || 15–1 || Robert Person (8–5) || Matt Clement (6–12) || None || 25,539 || 67–59
|- style="background:#bbb"
| – || August 27 || @ Rockies || colspan=6 | Postponed (rain); Makeup: August 28 as a day-night double-header
|- style="background:#fbb"
| 127 || August 28 (1) || @ Rockies || 6–11 || David Lee (3–1) || Scott Aldred (4–3) || None || 42,744 || 67–60
|- style="background:#fbb"
| 128 || August 28 (2) || @ Rockies || 0–4 || Brian Bohanon (11–10) || Joe Grahe (0–1) || None || 47,217 || 67–61
|- style="background:#fbb"
| 129 || August 29 || @ Rockies || 5–6 || Darryl Kile (8–12) || Paul Byrd (14–7) || Dave Veres (26) || 43,344 || 67–62
|- style="background:#fbb"
| 130 || August 30 || @ Giants || 4–6 (10) || Rich Rodriguez (1–0) || Billy Brewer (0–1) || None || 13,193 || 67–63
|- style="background:#fbb"
| 131 || August 31 || @ Giants || 1–8 || Kirk Rueter (13–7) || Randy Wolf (5–6) || None || 13,106 || 67–64
|-

|- style="background:#fbb"
| 132 || September 1 || @ Giants || 3–5 (11) || Rich Rodriguez (2–0) || Wayne Gomes (4–4) || None || 11,156 || 67–65
|- style="background:#fbb"
| 133 || September 2 || @ Giants || 2–3 || Joe Nathan (5–3) || Joe Grahe (0–2) || Robb Nen (31) || 12,299 || 67–66
|- style="background:#bfb"
| 134 || September 3 || Reds || 10–2 || Curt Schilling (15–5) || Steve Parris (7–2) || None || 14,447 || 68–66
|- style="background:#fbb"
| 135 || September 4 || Reds || 3–22 || Pete Harnisch (14–8) || Paul Byrd (14–8) || Stan Belinda (2) || 16,357 || 68–67
|- style="background:#fbb"
| 136 || September 5 || Reds || 7–9 || Denny Neagle (5–5) || Robert Person (8–6) || Scott Sullivan (3) || 18,839 || 68–68
|- style="background:#fbb"
| 137 || September 6 || Astros || 5–6 || José Lima (19–7) || Randy Wolf (5–7) || Billy Wagner (34) || 12,223 || 68–69
|- style="background:#fbb"
| 138 || September 7 || Astros || 6–8 || Jay Powell (5–4) || Wayne Gomes (4–5) || Doug Henry (1) || 12,934 || 68–70
|- style="background:#fbb"
| 139 || September 8 || Astros || 2–10 || Mike Hampton (19–3) || Curt Schilling (15–6) || None || 14,050 || 68–71
|- style="background:#fbb"
| 140 || September 9 || Astros || 1–3 || Shane Reynolds (15–11) || Steve Montgomery (1–5) || Billy Wagner (35) || 11,133 || 68–72
|- style="background:#fbb"
| 141 || September 10 || @ Diamondbacks || 1–3 || Randy Johnson (15–9) || Robert Person (8–7) || None || 34,700 || 68–73
|- style="background:#fbb"
| 142 || September 11 || @ Diamondbacks || 0–4 || Andy Benes (11–11) || Randy Wolf (5–8) || None || 42,442 || 68–74
|- style="background:#fbb"
| 143 || September 12 || @ Diamondbacks || 0–5 || Todd Stottlemyre (6–2) || Mike Grace (1–2) || None || 32,468 || 68–75
|- style="background:#fbb"
| 144 || September 13 || @ Astros || 2–13 || Mike Hampton (20–3) || Joe Grahe (0–3) || None || 44,399 || 68–76
|- style="background:#fbb"
| 145 || September 14 || @ Astros || 2–12 || Shane Reynolds (16–11) || Paul Byrd (14–9) || None || 25,164 || 68–77
|- style="background:#bfb"
| 146 || September 15 || @ Astros || 8–6 (10) || Wayne Gomes (5–5) || Doug Henry (2–3) || Billy Brewer (1) ||  || 69–77
|- style="background:#bfb"
| 147 || September 17 || @ Mets || 8–5 || Randy Wolf (6–8) || Al Leiter (11–11) || Billy Brewer (2) || 31,842 || 70–77
|- style="background:#fbb"
| 148 || September 18 || @ Mets || 1–11 || Masato Yoshii (12–8) || Mike Grace (1–3) || None || 37,655 || 70–78
|- style="background:#fbb"
| 149 || September 19 || @ Mets || 6–8 || Octavio Dotel (8–2) || Paul Byrd (14–10) || Armando Benítez (22) || 51,560 || 70–79
|- style="background:#fbb"
| 150 || September 20 || @ Brewers || 4–5 || Rocky Coppinger (4–4) || Carlton Loewer (2–6) || Bob Wickman (34) || 10,981 || 70–80
|- style="background:#fbb"
| 151 || September 21 || @ Brewers || 6–8 || Bill Pulsipher (5–6) || Anthony Shumaker (0–3) || Bob Wickman (35) || 11,371 || 70–81
|- style="background:#bfb"
| 152 || September 22 || @ Brewers || 12–3 || Amaury Telemaco (4–0) || Kyle Peterson (2–7) || None || 13,043 || 71–81
|- style="background:#fbb"
| 153 || September 23 || @ Brewers || 6–11 || Jason Bere (4–0) || Mike Grace (1–4) || None ||  || 71–82
|- style="background:#bfb"
| 154 || September 24 || Mets || 3–2 || Joe Grahe (1–3) || Armando Benítez (3–3) || Scott Aldred (1) || 21,649 || 72–82
|- style="background:#bfb"
| 155 || September 25 || Mets || 4–2 || Robert Person (9–7) || Kenny Rogers (10–4) || Wayne Gomes (19) || 23,319 || 73–82
|- style="background:#bfb"
| 156 || September 26 || Mets || 3–2 || Paul Byrd (15–10) || Rick Reed (10–5) || Steve Montgomery (1) || 26,370 || 74–82
|- style="background:#fbb"
| 157 || September 28 || Cubs || 2–8 || Steve Trachsel (8–17) || Randy Wolf (6–9) || None || 16,106 || 74–83
|- style="background:#bfb"
| 158 || September 29 || Cubs || 5–0 || Billy Brewer (1–1) || Micah Bowie (2–7) || None || 21,142 || 75–83
|- style="background:#bfb"
| 159 || September 30 || Cubs || 2–1 || Robert Person (10–7) || Brian McNichol (0–2) || Steve Montgomery (2) || 17,475 || 76–83
|-

|- style="background:#fbb"
| 160 || October 1 || Expos || 4–7 || Javier Vázquez (9–8) || Joe Grahe (1–4) || Ugueth Urbina (41) || 12,652 || 76–84
|- style="background:#fbb"
| 161 || October 2 || Expos || 3–13 || Jeremy Powell (4–8) || Paul Byrd (15–11) || Miguel Batista (1) || 12,871 || 77–84
|- style="background:#bfb"
| 162 || October 3 || Expos || 6–5 || Cliff Politte (1–0) || Scott Strickland (0–1) || Steve Montgomery' (3) || 23,892 || 77–85
|-

Roster

Player stats
Batting

Starters by positionNote: Pos = Position; G = Games played; AB = At bats; H = Hits; Avg. = Batting average; HR = Home runs; RBI = Runs batted inOther battersNote: G = Games played; AB = At bats; H = Hits; Avg. = Batting average; HR = Home runs; RBI = Runs batt\ed inPitching

 Starting pitchers Note: G = Games pitched; IP = Innings pitched; W = Wins; L = Losses; ERA = Earned run average; SO = StrikeoutsOther pitchersNote: G = Games pitched; IP = Innings pitched; W = Wins; L = Losses; ERA = Earned run average; SO = StrikeoutsRelief pitchersNote: G = Games pitched; W = Wins; L = Losses; SV = Saves; ERA = Earned run average; SO = Strikeouts Farm system 

References

1999 Philadelphia Phillies season at Baseball Reference''

Philadelphia Phillies seasons
Philadelphia Phillies Season, 1999
Philadelphia Phillies